The Cubatão River is a Brazilian river in the state of São Paulo. It finds its origins in latitude 23º56'11 "south and longitude 46º57'20" West. Its basin is between São Paulo and Santos. It empties out in Santos by delta type channels in the mangroves.

Tributaries 
 Left bank:
 Rio Cubatão de Cima
 Rio Pilões
 Ribeirão das Pedras
 Ribeirão Perequê
 Rio Mogi

References

External links
 DER - Mapa Rodoviário do Estado de São Paulo (2004) / Road Map of the State of São Paulo (2004)

Rivers of São Paulo (state)